Liu Weiguo (born 3 May 1992) is a Chinese professional footballer who currently plays for Chinese Super League club Changchun Yatai.

Club career
Liu Weiguo started his football career when he joined Shandong Luneng's youth academy at the age of 14 and was promoted to the club's first team in 2011. He played as the fourth-choice goalkeeper throughout the 2011 season. In November 2011, he transferred to Chinese Super League promoted side Dalian Aerbin to seek more playing time. On 18 July 2012, he made his debut for the club in the fourth round of the 2012 Chinese FA Cup in which Dalian won 2–0 against Shenyang Shenbei. On 5 August 2012, then manager Aleksandar Stanojević decided to replace Yu Ziqian, who had made many mistakes in several games throughout the 2012 season, with Liu who made his league debut for the club in a 1–1 draw against Shanghai Shenxin. Liu remained as the club's first-choice goalkeeper for the rest of the season after his outstanding debut. He later became the second-choice goalkeeper after Zhang Chong transferred to the club from Dalian Shide in 2013.

On 10 July 2015, Liu transferred to Chinese Super League club Guangzhou Evergrande. He was loaned to Liaoning Whowin for one season on 26 February 2016. He played two Chinese FA Cup matches for Liaoning throughout the entirety of his loan spell. Liu was named at Guangzhou Evergrande's reserve squad in the 2017 season. On 23 June 2017, Liu moved to China League Two side Yinchuan Helanshan on a half season loan deal. He returned to Guangzhou Evergrande but didn't name in the club's squad. In February 2019, Liu was loaned to China League One side Inner Mongolia Zhongyou for the 2019 season.

On 18 September 2020, Liu finally made his debut for Evergrande after 5 years since joining the club, keeping a clean sheet in a 2-0 win against Henan Jianye in the first round of the 2020 Chinese FA Cup.

On 29 April 2022, Liu joined Chinese Super League club Changchun Yatai. He made his debut for Yatai on 4 June 2022 in a 4-1 win against Guangzhou City. On 16 June 2022, his unmindful mistakes directly led to 2 opposition goals in a 4-0 defeat against Shandong Taishan, and he was subsequently substituted after the second one at the 60th minute.

Career statistics 
.

References

External links
 

1992 births
Living people
Association football goalkeepers
Chinese footballers
Footballers from Tianjin
Shandong Taishan F.C. players
Dalian Professional F.C. players
Guangzhou F.C. players
Liaoning F.C. players
Inner Mongolia Zhongyou F.C. players
Chinese Super League players
China League One players
China League Two players
21st-century Chinese people